Harimau Muda C is the team name for the former Malaysia national under-19 club. Football Association of Malaysia managed the Malaysia U-19 team as a football club that took part in Malaysia FAM League from 2013 season. The C team is for under-19 players, while Harimau Muda B players are between 18 and 21 and Harimau Muda A players are between 20 and 22.

The team is aimed at developing Malaysian youth players and will not recruit any foreign nationals in its squad. By entering Harimau Muda C in domestic competitions, FAM hopes to expose top Malaysia under-19 players to competitive matches, thus helping them prepare for international tournaments. As such, Harimau Muda C is one of a small number of football clubs in the world which places an age-restrictions on team members while playing in a national professional league. Harimau Muda C is currently playing in the Malaysia FAM League.

The team is aimed at developing Malaysian youth players and does not recruit any foreign nationals in its squad. On 25 November 2015,it was confirmed that the Harimau Muda has disbanded by FAM which means all the player from Harimau Muda A, Harimau Muda B and Harimau Muda C will be returned to their own state.

The name "Harimau Muda" means "Young Tigers" in English.

History 
In 2013, The Football Association of Malaysia agreed to replace Harimau Muda A with Harimau Muda B in the 2013 S.League campaign. Instead, Harimau Muda A will undergo an 8-month long training in central Europe and will be mainly based at Zlaté Moravce, Slovakia to prepare to defend their title in the 2013 Southeast Asian Games. Harimau Muda B will use aged under-20 players for the S. League with no foreign players and will be based in the Pasir Gudang Stadium, replacing Yishun Stadium as their previous home stadium.

In addition, Harimau Muda C was formed to provide a bigger pool of players and become a feeder team for Harimau Muda B, as Harimau Muda B did to Harimau Muda A. Harimau Muda C will make their debut in the 3rd Division of Malaysian football, the FAM League and will use under-18 aged players.

Honours

International records

AFF Youth Championship record

Kit manufacturers and financial sponsor 
 Nike

Stadium 
Harimau Muda C are currently based at Maybank Academy Field in Bangi, Selangor.

Officials 
Senior officials
 President/Chairman:
 Deputy President/Vice-chairman:

See also 
 Malaysia national football team
 Malaysia women's national football team
 Malaysia national under-23 football team
 Harimau Muda
 Harimau Muda A
 Harimau Muda B
 Malaysia Pahang Sports School
 Bukit Jalil Sports School
 SSTMI
 Malaysia XI
 Malaysia national futsal team

References

External links 
 Football Association of Malaysia
 Sekolah Sukan Bukit Jalil 

Malaysia national football team
Association football clubs established in 2013
Association football clubs disestablished in 2015
2013 establishments in Malaysia
2015 disestablishments in Malaysia
Defunct football clubs in Malaysia